Paulo Lopes de Faria (February 24, 1931 Igaratinga - July 16, 2009) was the Brazilian Archbishop of the Roman Catholic Archdiocese of Diamantina from May 14, 1997 until his retirement on May 30, 2007. He was succeeded by Archbishop João Bosco Oliver de Faria, but remained Archbishop Emeritus of the diocese until his death in 2009.

Archbishop Paulo Lopes de Faria died on July 16, 2009, in Belo Horizonte at the age of 78.

References and external links

Catholic Hierarchy: Archbishop Paulo Lopes de Faria†
Cancao Nova Noticias: Archbishop Emeritus of Diamantina dies (Portuguese)

1931 births
2009 deaths
21st-century Roman Catholic archbishops in Brazil
People from Minas Gerais
20th-century Roman Catholic archbishops in Brazil
Roman Catholic archbishops of Diamantina
Roman Catholic bishops of Diamantina
Roman Catholic bishops of Itabuna